The 1955 Drexel Dragons football team represented the Drexel Institute of Technology (renamed Drexel University in 1970) as an independent during the 1955 college football season.  Eddie Allen was the team's head coach.  The team became the first undefeated football team at the school that had a full schedule of collegiate opponents.  Left guard Vince Vidas was awarded first string on the 1955 Little All-America college football team.

Schedule

Roster

References

Drexel
Drexel Dragons football seasons
College football undefeated seasons
Drexel Dragons football